Maesa Stadium is a multi-use stadium in Tondano, Indonesia.  It is currently used mostly for football matches and is the home stadium for Persmin Minahasa.  The stadium has a capacity of 25,000.

References

Sports venues in Indonesia
Football venues in Indonesia
Buildings and structures in North Sulawesi